Odontopaschia ecnomia is a species of snout moth in the genus Odontopaschia. It was described by Turner in 1913, and is known from Queensland, Australia.

References

Moths described in 1913
Epipaschiinae